Turkish Billiards Federation (TBF) is the governing body of the cue sports in Turkey. Founded on December 2, 2006, it is based in Ankara.  The Turkish organization is member of the Confédération Européenne de Billard (CEB)  and the Union Mondiale de Billard (UMB). Since May 2014, the TBF is chaired by Ersan Ercan.

The Turkish Billiard Federation organizes cue sports competitions at national, European and World level. 

National level official competitions are:
Three-cushion billiards
 Turkish Three-cushion Championship
 Turkish Three-cushion First League
 Turkish Three-cushion Teams Championship
 Turkish Women"s Three-cushion Championship
 Turkish Youth Three-cushion Championship

Pool
 Turkish Pool Championship
 Inter University Pool Tournament

Artistic billiards
Turkish Artistic billiards Championship

References

Federation
Billiard
Sports organizations established in 1993
Organizations based in Ankara
1993 establishments in Turkey
Cue sports governing bodies